Vittória Lopes de Mello (born 15 March 1996) is a Brazilian triathlete. In 2019, she won the silver medal in the women's triathlon at the 2019 Pan American Games. She also won the gold medal in the mixed relay event together with Luisa Baptista, Kaue Willy and Manoel Messias.

In 2019, she also competed at the 2019 Military World Games held in Wuhan, China where she won the bronze medal in the women's triathlon and the gold medal in the women's team event together with Luisa Baptista and Beatriz Neres.

She represented Brazil at the 2020 Summer Olympics in Tokyo, Japan in the women's event.

References

External links 
 

Living people
1996 births
Sportspeople from Fortaleza
Brazilian female triathletes
Pan American Games medalists in triathlon
Pan American Games gold medalists for Brazil
Pan American Games silver medalists for Brazil
Medalists at the 2019 Pan American Games
Triathletes at the 2019 Pan American Games
Triathletes at the 2020 Summer Olympics
Olympic triathletes of Brazil
Competitors at the 2018 South American Games
Competitors at the 2022 South American Games
South American Games gold medalists for Brazil
South American Games silver medalists for Brazil
South American Games medalists in triathlon
20th-century Brazilian women
21st-century Brazilian women